Chris Sullivan (born July 19, 1980) is an American actor and musician. He starred on the NBC drama This Is Us, as Toby Damon, for which he received two Primetime Emmy Award nominations.

Career
Much of Sullivan's early stage experience came in Chicago, where he received improv training at the iO Theater. Among his Chicago stage experiences were in the cast of Defending the Caveman at the Lakeshore Theater and the cast of The Ballad of Emmett Till at the Goodman Theatre. After appearing in the original Broadway cast of Lombardi, Sullivan joined the long-running revival of Chicago in 2011.

He first gained attention for his portrayal of Tom Cleary on the Cinemax drama The Knick. He also played Taserface in Guardians of the Galaxy Vol. 2 and Benny Hammond in Stranger Things.

He has starred in single episodes of various TV series: A Gifted Man (2012), Elementary, Law & Order: Special Victims Unit, and The Americans (2013).

He also played Sprit in the 2008 Sundance Film Festival nominated movie North Starr, and appeared in such films as The Normal Heart and The Drop (2014), the latter with The Knick co-star Jeremy Bobb.

From 2016 to 2022, Sullivan starred as Toby Damon on This Is Us. For this role, Sullivan has received two nominations for the Primetime Emmy Award for Outstanding Supporting Actor in a Drama Series.

Sullivan has done voice-over work. He provided the voice for the camel in the popular "Hump Day" ad by the American auto insurance company GEICO.

In March 2022, Sullivan was set to lead comedy pilot The Son In Law at ABC.

Personal life
He is married to producer Rachel Sullivan. Their son was born on July 28, 2020 and their daughter was born in October 2022.

Filmography

Film

Television

Stage

Source:

Video games

References

External links

 

Living people
American male television actors
1980 births
American male voice actors
Actors from Palm Springs, California